Bukwica may refer to the following places in Poland:
Bukwica, Lower Silesian Voivodeship (south-west Poland)
Bukwica, West Pomeranian Voivodeship (north-west Poland)